David Walsh is an Irish former Gaelic footballer who plays for Naomh Bríd and also, formerly, for the Donegal county team.

A member of the Donegal panel that won the 2012 All-Ireland Senior Football Championship Final against Mayo, he came on as a substitute in the second half of the game in place of Ryan Bradley.

He injured his shoulder in a club championship match in October 2012 but returned to training ahead of the 2013 Ulster Championship.

In January 2017, Walsh retired from the inter-county game.

Honours
Donegal
 All-Ireland Senior Football Championship: 2012
 Ulster Senior Football Championship: 2011, 2012, 2014

References

Place of birth missing (living people)
Year of birth missing (living people)
Living people
Donegal inter-county Gaelic footballers
Gaelic football forwards
Naomh Bríd Gaelic footballers
Winners of one All-Ireland medal (Gaelic football)